Dichomeris matsumurai is a moth in the family Gelechiidae. It was described by Ponomarenko and Ueda in 2004. It is found in Thailand.

The forewings are yellowish brown with scattered brown scales, forming transverse streaks along the longitudinal wing axis. The pattern of the forewings is formed by eleven to twelve dark brown short costal marks of different width and shape. There are two distinct dark brown dots at the end of the cell and at the middle of the anal fold, as well as seven dark brown dots along the apex and termen. The hindwings are dark brown.

Etymology
The species is named for Prof. T. Matsumura.

References

Moths described in 2004
matsumurai